Cottle Knob is a summit in West Virginia, in the United States.

Cottle Knob was named after C. W. Cottle, a pioneer hunter.

References

Mountains of Nicholas County, West Virginia
Mountains of West Virginia